Donagh (pronounced) is a small village and townland in County Fermanagh, Northern Ireland. It lies between Lisnaskea and Newtownbutler in the south-east of the county. In the 2001 Census it had a population of 255. It is situated within Fermanagh and Omagh district.

There is another townland called Donagh in County Fermanagh, as well as one in County Monaghan in the Republic of Ireland.

Donagh was originally known in Irish as Ua Dúnáin Dhomhnaigh Maighe da Claoíne do Mharbhad (meaning 'O'Doonan's Church of the Plain of the Two Slopes'), later known in Irish as Domhnach Maighe Dhá Chlaoine (meaning 'Church of the Plain of the Two Slopes'). It was originally anglicised as 'Donoghmoychinny' or 'Donaghmoyline'. It was later anglicised simply as Donagh.

Features 
The village features two protected sites: one is Donagh House, a listed building, the other an ancient ecclesiastical site featuring a ruined church and a graveyard.

St Patrick's is the local GAA club, and won the Fermanagh Senior Football Championship in 2008.

References 

Villages in County Fermanagh
Townlands of County Fermanagh
Fermanagh and Omagh district